{{Automatic taxobox
| image = Micronycteris microtis.png
| image_caption = Common big-eared bat (Micronycteris microtis)
| taxon = Micronycteris
| authority = Gray, 1866
| type_species = Phyllophora megalotis| type_species_authority = Gray, 1842
| subdivision_ranks = Species
| subdivision = Micronycteris brossetiMicronycteris buririMicronycteris giovanniaeMicronycteris hirsutaMicronycteris homeziMicronycteris matsesMicronycteris megalotisMicronycteris microtisMicronycteris minutaMicronycteris sanborniMicronycteris schmidtorumMicronycteris yatesi}}Micronycteris is a genus of leaf-nosed bats.

List of species
Genus Micronycteris - little big-eared bats
Brosset's big-eared bat, Micronycteris brosseti Simmons & Voss, 1998
 Saint Vincent big-eared bat, Micronycteris buriri Larsen, Siles, Pedersen, & Kwiecinski, 2011
 Micronycteris giovanniae Baker & Fonseca, 2007
Hairy big-eared bat, Micronycteris hirsuta (Peters, 1869)
Matses's big-eared bat, Micronycteris matses Simmons, Voss, & Fleck, 2002
Little big-eared bat, Micronycteris megalotis (Gray, 1842)
Common big-eared bat, Micronycteris microtis Miller, 1898
White-bellied big-eared bat, Micronycteris minuta (Gervais, 1855)
Sanborn's big-eared bat, Micronycteris sanborni Simmons, 1996
Schmidts's big-eared bat, Micronycteris schmidtorum Sanborn, 1935
Yates's big-eared bat, Micronycteris yatesi Siles & Brooks, 2013

References

 Ochoa, J. G., & J. H. Sánchez. 2005. Taxonomic status of Micronycteris homezi (Chiroptera: Phyllostomidae). Mammalia 69:323–335.
 Fonseca, R. M., S. R. Hoofer, C. A. Porter, C. A. Cline, D. A. Parish, F. G. Hoffmann, & R. J. Baker. 2007. Morphological and molecular variation within Little Big-eared bats of the genus Micronycteris (Phyllostomidae: Micronycterinae) from San Lorenzo, Ecuador. In: Kelt, D.A., Lessa, E.P., Salazar-Bravo, J., Patton, J.L. (Eds.),The Quintessential Naturalist: Honoring the Life and Legacy of Oliver P. Pearson, vol. 134. University of California Publications in Zoology, pp. 721–746,1–981.
 Larsen, P. A., L. Siles, S. C. Pedersen, AND G. G. Kwiecinski. 2011. A new species of Micronycteris'' (Chiroptera: Phyllostomidae) from Saint Vincent, Lesser Antilles. Mammalian Biology 76:687–700.

 
Phyllostomidae
Bat genera
Taxa named by John Edward Gray